John Britton may refer to:

John Britton (antiquary) (1771–1857), English antiquary, topographer, author and editor
John Britton (baseball) (1919–1990), American baseball player
John Britton (doctor) (1925–1994), American physician and abortion provider, killed by Paul Jennings Hill
John Britton (martyr) (died 1598), English Roman Catholic martyr
John Britton (mathematician) (1927–1994), English mathematician, combinatorial group theorist
John Edwin Britton (1924–2020), Canadian politician 
Jack Britton (1885–1962), American boxer
Jack Britton (footballer) (1900–1953), Scottish football goalkeeper
John Britton (swimmer), 1923–2004, British and Kenyan Paralympian